The Indiana Transportation Museum (initialized ITM, reporting mark ITMZ) is a railroad museum that was formerly located in the Forest Park neighborhood of Noblesville, Indiana, United States. It owns a variety of preserved railroad equipment, some of which still operate today. ITM is currently Located in Logansport, Indiana.

Overview 
The Indiana Transportation Museum is an all-volunteer not-for-profit museum dedicated to preserving and showcasing railroads of Indiana, and sharing the equipment and information with the public, as well as operating trains to show how people traveled across the country in the past.

In 2018, the museum was evicted from its home in Forest Park by the city of Noblesville. ITM moved all retained equipment to a site in Logansport, Indiana.

Heritage railroad 
Excursion service on the line had been suspended due to a dispute with the HHPA. The museum submitted a proposal to HHPA requesting authorization to resume service.

The museum operated out of Forest Park in Noblesville and traveled to the northern terminus of the line in Tipton, Indiana, and to the southern terminus at approximately 39th Street in Indianapolis. The rail line originally extended further south but had been abandoned.

The rail line originally connected to the Norfolk Southern railroad in Tipton and to the CSX railroad in Indianapolis via the Belt Line. The railroad line had also been operated as a freight railroad by the Indiana Rail Road, hauling coal to the power generating plant in Cicero, Indiana, until the plant's conversion to natural gas in 2003.

The connection in Tipton was cut by Norfolk Southern in 1997 and the bridge connecting the line to CSX was removed by the Indiana Department of Transportation during the rebuilding of Interstate 70 in Indianapolis. In spring 2010, CSX railroad removed the diamonds connecting the southern portion to the Belt Railroad, thus isolating the line from the U.S. rail system.

Preservation 

The museum is home to many pieces of railroading history, with primary emphasis on locomotives and equipment relating to the Nickel Plate Railroad. Most passengers are carried in the museum's restored Budd cars that date back to 1937 and were originally in service on the Santa Fe Railroad and the New Jersey Transit Authority before being sold to the museum as scrap in the early 1980s. Several cars have been restored and others await funds for restoration.

While the museum was in Noblesville, it had in its collection the 1898 private railcar of Henry Morrison Flagler's Florida East Coast Railroad (FEC) #90.

At the beginning of 2003, the museum's operating steam locomotive, Nickel Plate 587, was taken out of service for a federally mandated boiler rebuild. Since then, work has been ongoing for the restoration of this locomotive. In 2008, ownership of the engine was permanently transferred from the Indianapolis Parks Department to the ITM. In 2018, the locomotive was held in storage in Ravenna, Kentucky by the Kentucky Steam Heritage Corporation. On March 5, 2021, the ownership of No. 587 was transferred from the Indiana Transportation Museum to a private individual.

Events 
While in Noblesville, the Indiana Transportation Museum operated different excursions, ranging from holiday trains to shuttles in freight cabooses.

 The Morse Lake Dinner Train was a dinner train which operated from Noblesville to a variety of restaurants in Cicero, Indiana, near Morse Lake.
 The Fair Train was the museum's biggest yearly event with ITM passenger trains transporting as many as 16,000 thousand people to the Indiana State Fair every day of the fair with 10 round trips each day of the fair during August. As of 2017, this excursion has been put on hold indefinitely.
 The Polar Bear Express was held in the months of November and December. It included a train ride and a visit from Santa Claus.
 The Harvest Train was held every weekend in October and was supported by the Hamilton Heights High School FFA, who grow and sell pumpkins alongside the rail line.
 The Blue Arrow was run multiple Saturdays throughout the late spring, summer, and fall from Noblesville to Tipton. It gained its name because the stop in Tipton was at end of the track and adjacent to the Pizza Shack, where riders could eat. Riders also had the option of being shuttled to the nearby Pizza King or Jim Dandy Restaurant for their buffets, or on select dates, a meal at the Tipton Elks Club.
 Special events included various festivals in Tipton and the towns of Atlanta and Arcadia; private charters were also available.

School programs 
The museum offered custom school tours, which included a tour of the museum grounds and an excursion train ride.

Motive power 
 Nickel Plate Road 2-8-2 #587; built by Baldwin Locomotive Works in September 1918 as Lake Erie & Western 2-8-2 #5541; under restoration since 2003; moved to Kentucky for restoration in 2018 and sold to a private owner.
 Nickel Plate Road GP7L #426; built by Electro-Motive Diesel in July 1953; operational since 2004; sold to NPE.
 Indiana Transportation Museum GP9 #200; built by Electro-Motive Diesel in April 1954 as Union Pacific GP9 #200; operational from 2000 to 2018; retained by the city of Noblesville in storage.
 Nickel Plate Road F7A #83A; built by Electro-Motive Diesel as Milwaukee Road F7A #110C in December 1950; operational since 1983; sold to NPE.
 Monon SW-1 #DS-50; built by Electro-Motive Diesel in February 1942; cab destroyed on route to Logansport, Indiana; moved to Hoosier Valley Railroad Museum; restoration pending.
 Nickel Plate Road VO-1000 #99; built by Baldwin Locomotive Works as Crane Naval Depot VO-1000 #9 in April 1945; formerly on static display; sale to the city of Kokomo failed; retained by city of Noblesville and remains on display.
 Nickel Plate Road 44-Tonner #91; built by GE Transportation as Boyne City Railroad 44-Tonner #70 in September 1950; formerly on static display; sale to the city of Kokomo failed; sold to anonymous party via Ozark Mountain RailCar.
 Monon FP7 #96C; built by Electro Motive Diesel as Milwaukee Road FP7 #96C in January 1951; retained by city of Noblesville and remains in storage.
 Milwaukee Road F7A #83C; built by Electro-Motive Diesel as Milwaukee Road F7A #72C in July 1950; under restoration from 2007 to 2018; retained by city of Noblesville in storage.
 Milwaukee Road F7B #68B; built by Electro-Motive Diesel in July 1950; in storage since 1983; retained by city of Noblesville in storage.
 Indianapolis Power and Light 0-4-0 Fireless #1; built by H.K. Porter in 1950; sold to the Hesston Steam Museum in 2018; the tank/pressure vessel was scrapped.
 Milwaukee Road SW-1 #867; built by Electro-Motive Diesel in 1939; repainted to original Milwaukee Road #1613 by Thomas Harleman in 2015; scrapped on July 4, 2018.

Rolling Stock 
 13 Stainless-Steel Budd Coaches
 Florida East Coast Private Car #90 "Henry Flagler"; sold to the Monon Connection Museum.
 Nickel Plate Road Business Car #1; sold to Felix Powell, on loan to NPE.
 Louisville & Nashville Diner #2728; sold to the Tennessee Valley Railroad Museum.
 Monon Cupola Extended-vision Caboose #81528; privately owned, used by Nickel Plate Express for various events.
 Nickel Plate Road Cupola Caboose #770
 Nickel Plate Road Bay window
 Caboose #405

See also 
 List of United States railroads
 List of Indiana railroads
 List of heritage railroads in the United States
 List of railway museums

References

Notes

External links 

 Indiana Transportation Museum website
 The Nickel Plate Road Historical & Technical Society

Museums established in 1960
Railroad museums in Indiana
Heritage railroads in Indiana
Museums in Hamilton County, Indiana
Indiana railroads